The UCR/California Museum of Photography (CMP) is an off-campus institution and department of the College of Humanities, Arts, and Social Sciences at the University of California, Riverside, California, USA. The collections of UCR/CMP form the largest, most comprehensive holding of any photographic collection in the Western half of the United States. The growing UCR/CMP collections encompass a wide array of photographic arts, history, and technology.

Collections overview

The collections are organized into four interlinked areas.

Bingham Technology Collection
The Bingham Technology Collection has grown from the original gift of 2,000 vintage cameras donated by Dr. Robert Bingham in 1973 to a current count of 10,000 cameras, viewing devices, and photographic apparatus. In 1975, Popular Photography declared that UCR's Bingham Camera Collection was second only to the George Eastman House Collection in Rochester, New York, and the collection of the Smithsonian Institution.

The collection holds four synoptic subsets of camera technology: The Kibbey Zeiss-Ikon Collection; Curtis Polaroid Collection; Wodinsky Ihagee-Exakta Collection and the Teague Kodak Brownie Collection. Other significant artifacts include a Louis daguerre camera, a Simon Wing multi-lens wet plate camera, a fully functioning Caille Bros. Cail-O-Scope, and a Ponti megalethoscope. As the most complete and actively used camera collection in the western states, this resource is highly valued by photography scholars, other museums, film/video producers, book/magazine publishers, regional schools, and photo clubs.

University Print Collection
The University Print Collection was founded in 1979 when several community patrons purchased a remarkable collection of photographic master prints from Friends of Photography. Currently, the collection exceeds 20,000 images that were created by over 1,000 photographers, including 7,000 Ansel Adams negatives. The University Print Collection includes quantities of vintage daguerreotypes, 1840s calotype negatives, Civil War era ambrotypes, and commercial tintypes as well as images from popular culture (1840s–present).

A major subset of the University Print Collection is the Keystone-Mast Collection, which comprises over 250,000 original stereoscopic negatives and 100,000 paper prints. The original glass and film negatives form a vital primary record of worldwide social, cultural, industrial, agricultural historicity between 1860 and 1950. The visual online catalogs of the Keystone-Mast Collection have been available on the UCR/CMP website since 2001. A National Endowment for the Humanities (NEH) Preservation and Access Grant primarily funded these online catalogs.

Additional funding, by Institute for Museum and Library Services (IMLS), supports the MOAC project to create catalogs served on the California Digital Library.

UCR/CMP Study Center Library
UCR/CMP Study Center Library and Roy McJunkin Imaging Center are interlinked research areas containing 10,000 photography monographs, manuscript materials, artists books, technical literature, exhibition catalogs, salon annuals and runs of photography periodicals, a copy stand, plus a full complement of expanding computer technology.  International scholars, the education communities, and the museum staff utilize these research areas.

Digital Virtual Collection
The Digital Virtual Collection is the digitized content of the museum’s collection. Since 1994 when the Museum first went online, UCR/CMP has added over 13,000 pages of content that include over 400 themed micro-sites and 9 major finding aids. Ongoing grants and initiatives have enabled the museum to continue work on the website and allowed for continued digitization of artifacts found in the museums collections.

References

External links

 UCR/California Museum of Photography
 California Digital Library

Museum of Photography
Photo archives in the United States
Museums in Riverside, California
Photography museums and galleries in the United States
Art museums and galleries in California
Photographic technology museums
University museums in California